Palmella may refer to:

 Palmella (alga), a genus of algae, the type genus of the family Palmellaceae
 The plant Yucca elata
 Nemapogon palmella, a moth species

People named Palmella
 George Louis Palmella Busson du Maurier, 1834–1896 (1834–1896), cartoonist and author

Ships named Palmella

See also
 Palmela Municipality